Kevin Smith is an American screenwriter, actor, film producer, and director who often works with certain actors and crew members in multiple feature film directing projects.

The actors who collaborated with Smith the most frequently are Jason Mewes, Jennifer Schwalbach Smith and Jason Lee, who all appeared in nine and eight films, respectively.

Stan Lee, the famous American comic book writer, made extensive cameos in two films of Smith: Mallrats (1997) and Jay and Silent Bob Reboot (2019, posthumous appearance).

Film producer and actor Scott Mosier starred in six of his films, and served as the producer of eight of them.

Other frequent actors of Smith include: with seven films (Ben Affleck, Brian O'Halloran and Walter Flanagan), six films (Harley Quinn Smith, his daughter), five films (Matt Damon and Jeff Anderson), four films (Joey Lauren Adams, Ethan Suplee, Justin Long, Ralph Garman and Bryan Johnson) and three films (George Carlin, Jason Biggs and Dwight Ewell).

Cast

See also 

 Kevin Smith filmography

References 

Kevin Smith